Xi'e (Chinese: , p Xī'è) was a region of ancient China in present-day Henan and Hubei. Under the Qin and Han dynasties and during the Three Kingdoms period, Xi'e County (t , s , Xī'èxiàn) was also a county in the Nanyang Commandery.

Regions of China

Name
Xi'e (lit. "Western E") took its name from the E, a Shang-dynasty vassal state probably originally located in modern Shanxi. The name is now pronounced as a brief, hard schwa (IPA: ), but the ancient pronunciation of the name has been reconstructed as closer to *Ngˤak. Around the time of the Qin, therefore, "Xi'e" would have been pronounced something like *Snˤər Ngˤak. By the Jin, it would have been Middle Chinese Ser Ngak.

History
During the Zhou, E was forced to relocate at least twice under pressure from Jin and Chu. Absorbed by Chu in 863 BC, E was adopted as the state's capital by a number of Chu kings prior to their final conquest by Shi Huangdi in 223 BC. Ezhou then became a province under the Qin and Han.

Thereafter, Xi'e was a county in the Nanyang Commandery during the Qin and Han dynasties and the Three Kingdoms period.

Famous residents
It was the birthplace of Zhang Heng (AD 78–139), a famous Chinese polymath of the Han dynasty. Du Xi served as its chief around the end of the 2nd century. Luo Xian (d. 270) was proclaimed Marquis of Xi'e late in life as part of the creation of the Jin at the end of the Three Kingdoms period.

References

Geographic history of China